Pardomima telanepsia is a moth in the family Crambidae. It was described by Edward L. Martin in 1955. It is found in Cameroon, Chad, Equatorial Guinea, Ghana, Ivory Coast and Nigeria.

References

Moths described in 1955
Spilomelinae